Kevin Harbut (born 24 April 1971) is a British freestyle skier. He competed in the men's aerials event at the 1998 Winter Olympics.

References

External links
 

1971 births
Living people
British male freestyle skiers
Olympic freestyle skiers of Great Britain
Freestyle skiers at the 1998 Winter Olympics
Sportspeople from Southampton